Gustavian style was the leading style in Swedish architecture, decor and crafts during the Gustavian era, inspired by French Neoclassicism. The style was established in the 1780s, and is named after King Gustav III of Sweden.

References 

Sweden during the Gustavian era
18th century in Sweden
Architectural styles
History of furniture
Gustav III